Rudd ministry may refer to:

 First Rudd ministry (2007–2010)
 Second Rudd ministry (June–September 2013)